In mathematics, an elliptic hypergeometric series is a series Σcn such that the ratio
cn/cn−1 is an elliptic function of n, analogous to generalized hypergeometric series where the ratio is a rational function of n, and basic hypergeometric series where the ratio is a periodic function of the complex number  n.

Definitions
The q-Pochhammer symbol is defined by 

The modified Jacobi theta function with argument x and nome p is defined by

The elliptic shifted factorial is defined by

The theta hypergeometric series r+1Er is defined by

The very well poised theta hypergeometric series r+1Vr is defined by

The bilateral theta hypergeometric series rGr is defined by

Definitions of additive elliptic hypergeometric series

The elliptic numbers are defined by 

where the Jacobi theta function is defined by

The additive elliptic shifted factorials are defined by

The additive theta hypergeometric series r+1er is defined by

The additive very well poised theta hypergeometric series r+1vr is defined by

Further reading

References

Hypergeometric functions